Barkerville was the main town of the Cariboo Gold Rush in British Columbia, Canada, and is preserved as a historic town. BC Highway 26, which follows the route of the Cariboo Wagon Road, the original access to Barkerville, goes through it.

History

Founding
Barkerville is located on the western edge of the Cariboo Mountains in British Columbia. It was named after Billy Barker from Cambridgeshire, England, who was among those who first struck gold at the location in 1861. His claim was the richest and the most famous.

Barkerville was built up almost overnight, and was a case of "growth via word of mouth". It grew as fast as the word of Barker's strike spread. His claim would eventually yield 37,500 ounces (1,065 kg/2,350 lb) of gold.

Before the construction of the Cariboo Wagon Road, people hauled their own supplies to Barkerville, either on their backs or in a pack train. Because supplies were scarce, the prices of even the most everyday items were extremely high. High prices for goods in Barkerville did not ease up until the Cariboo Road had been finished, when goods could be transported by huge freight wagons. Soon, movers of freight boasted that they could pack and carry a set of champagne glasses without any breakage—for a price, of course. More women came to Barkerville after the construction of the Cariboo Road.

Cattle were driven north up the Okanagan valley via what is now Highway 97 into Canada to provide meat for the miners and residents of Barkerville.

Growth

At first, the town consisted only of makeshift cabins and tents. By the mid-1860s, however, Barkerville had a population of approximately 5,000, 3,000 of whom were Chinese.

Even though its population was transient and largely dependent on mining, Barkerville was becoming more of a real community. It had several general stores and boarding houses, a drugstore that also sold newspapers and cigars, a barbershop that cut women's as well as men's hair, the "Wake-Up Jake Restaurant and Coffee Salon", a theatre (the Theatre Royal), and a literary society (the Cariboo Literary Society). 

Horse racing and prize fighting were common entertainments. Among the so-called "sober set," church services were extremely well attended. The general stores were the most profitable of the merchants. As they had the only source of food, the store owners could increase the price of foods and supplies. In the height of the gold rush, the stores sold flour for as high as $1.25 per pound. Beans, meat, and dried fruit were sold for a dollar a pound. But as the gold rush ended, the stores went bankrupt and finally out of business.
 
People of Chinese descent were an important part of Barkerville life for almost a hundred years. They established a number of businesses, including the Kwong Lee Company of Victoria., a general store that sold groceries, clothing, hardware, and mining tools. The company had stores in other parts of British Columbia, but the Barkerville store was one of the most impressive in town. The Chinese community also built cabins (for Chinese miners, who saved money by sharing four or five to a cabin) and Tai Ping (the "Peace Room"), the equivalent of a modern nursing home. Chinese benevolent associations provided social services to the Chinese community, and also resolved disputes within the Chinese community without the use of BC courts.

Decline
On September 16, 1868, Barkerville was destroyed by a fire that spread quickly through the wooden buildings. Rebuilding began immediately, and at an impressive pace. Within six weeks, ninety buildings had been rebuilt. Boardwalks were improved, and the narrow and winding main street was widened and straightened. By 1880, there were enough children in the area to build the Barkerville School. It had thirteen pupils and one piece of school equipment—a chalkboard. Even so, Barkerville's population was declining by the end of the 19th century and it eventually had only a few residents. It had a revival in the 1930s, when the Great Depression caused widespread unemployment, and the price of gold skyrocketed. But as the depression turned for the better, Barkerville declined to a very small village.

Preservation

In 1998, Barkerville Historic Park was dissolved and two properties were created: Barkerville Provincial Park and Barkerville Historic Town (Provincial Heritage Property). However, in 2006, the BC Ministry of the Environment repealed "Barkerville Provincial Park" and transferred ownership of it to the Ministry of Tourism, Sport and the Arts to create Barkerville Historic Town and Park.

In 2008, Barkerville's Chee Kung Tong Building
was designated a National Historic Site of Canada. The two-storey board and batten structure was completed in 1877 and originally used by the Chee Kung Tong organization, a benevolent association for recent arrivals. It is representative of the community building among immigrant Chinese labourers and merchants in new settlements throughout Canada.

Barkerville Historic Town and Park
Barkerville Historic Town and Park Camping Sites consists of three sites: Government Hill Site (7.4 acres), Lowhee Site (49.4 acres), and Forest Rose Site (79 acres), all of which are operated by Barkerville Historic Town and Park.

Having been fully restored in the 1950s, Barkerville appears as it did in its heyday. The history of each building has been researched and documented. No residents remain; they were either bought out or moved to New Barkerville during the restoration of the site.

In 1980 part of the western movie Harry Tracy, Desperado was made here.

The 2022 Punjabi film, Chhalla Mud Ke Nahi Aaya, directed by Amrinder Gill, was also shot here.

In 2017, the Shamrock Tube Run, a tubing hill complete with a conveyor belt, was opened to attract guests in the winter months. In 2022, the tube run was dismantled.

Climate
Barkerville has a subarctic climate (Köppen climate classification Dfc), which makes it have long, cold and snowy winter and short and cool summers due to its high altitude and latitude. Its growing season averages only 66 days.

Notable people
 Bert Sincock - Major League Baseball pitcher

See also
British Columbia gold rushes
Wells, British Columbia
Cariboo Road
Old Cariboo Road
List of filming locations in the British Columbia Interior

References

External links

www.bakerville.ca

1862 establishments in the British Empire
Protected areas established in 1959
Hudson's Bay Company trading posts
Ghost towns in British Columbia
Museums in British Columbia
Open-air museums in Canada
British Columbia gold rushes
Geography of the Cariboo
National Historic Sites in British Columbia
Former Provincial Parks of British Columbia